Austinburg is a census-designated place in northern Austinburg Township, Ashtabula County, Ohio, United States.  It has a post office with the ZIP code 44010.  It lies at the intersection of State Routes 45 and 307. As of the 2010 census it had a population of 516, out of a total population of 2,197 in Austinburg Township.

Austinburg was laid out ca. 1800 by Judge Eliphalet Austin, and named for him.

Austinburg is home to a large white wooden rocking chair, measuring approximately 25 feet tall.

References

Census-designated places in Ohio
Census-designated places in Ashtabula County, Ohio
1800 establishments in the Northwest Territory